Estadio Parque Municipal is a multi-use stadium in Valdivia, Chile. It's used mostly for football matches and is Deportes Valdivia's home stadium.

The stadium holds 5,000 people.

References

Sports venues in Valdivia
Football venues in Chile